John  McGeady (born 17 April 1958) is a Scottish former professional footballer who played as a winger in Scotland, England and the United States. He is the father of Republic of Ireland international player Aiden McGeady.

Early life
McGeady was born in Glasgow to parents originally from County Donegal, and educated at Holyrood Secondary School. Residing in Govanhill, with his father and younger brother Pat he attended matches of Third Lanark, whose ground was located a few blocks from their home, until the club folded in 1967.

Playing career
Beginning as an amateur in Scotland with Third Lanark (the juvenile team having continued after the demise of the professional arm), McGeady signed professional terms with Sheffield United in 1975, making 16 league appearances. He was briefly a teammate of the famous former Celtic winger Jimmy Johnstone, but suffered a serious injury to his knee aged 19.

McGeady then spent time in the American Soccer League with the Southern California Lazers, before going to play with Newport County, where he made two league appearances between 1978 and 1979 before retiring aged 23.

Career after football
After the end of his footballing career McGeady worked in the construction industry before becoming an English teacher at Holyrood Secondary, where he had been a pupil.

References

1958 births
Living people
Scottish footballers
Footballers from Glasgow
Scottish expatriate footballers
Third Lanark A.C. players
Sheffield United F.C. players
Southern California Lazers players
Newport County A.F.C. players
English Football League players
American Soccer League (1933–1983) players
Scottish people of Irish descent
People educated at Holyrood Secondary School
Scottish schoolteachers
Scottish expatriate sportspeople in the United States
Expatriate soccer players in the United States
Association football wingers
People from Govanhill and Crosshill